Cake in a Cup is a cupcake shop, located in Toledo, Ohio. It is owned by Lori Jacobs and Dana Iliev, and opened in 2008.

History
Lori Jacobs and Dana Iliev met while working at Grumpy's, a deli restaurant in Toledo.Before opening the shop, the two sold cupcakes out of Iliev's kitchen, neither one having any formal training.

Business
The shop sells a range of cupcakes in different flavors, and does catering for weddings and other events.

In 2011, Jacobs and Iliev participated in an episode in the reality TV show Cupcake Wars, a baking contest on the Food Network, and won the first prize. The episode's theme was the art and film of director Tim Burton.

References

External links

Bakeries of the United States
2008 establishments in Ohio
Companies based in Toledo, Ohio